Tybalmia tetrops is a species of beetle in the family Cerambycidae. It was described by Henry Walter Bates in 1872. It is known from Ecuador, Brazil and Peru.

References

Onciderini
Beetles described in 1872